"One of These Days" is a song written by Earl Montgomery, first recorded by George Jones in 1972, and most successfully released by American country music artist Emmylou Harris in March 1976 as the second single from the album Elite Hotel.  The Emmylou Harris recording reached number 3 on the Billboard Hot Country Singles & Tracks chart.

Charts

Weekly charts

Year-end charts

Uses In Media
"One of These Days" is used as background music in the fourth episode of the 2018 Hulu series Castle Rock.

Other Versions
Tammy Wynette covered “One of These Days” in 1976, including her version on her album You and Me.

References

1976 singles
Emmylou Harris songs
Reprise Records singles
Songs written by Earl Montgomery
Song recordings produced by Brian Ahern (producer)
1972 songs
George Jones songs
Tammy Wynette songs